Dilip Singh Rawat is an Indian politician and member of the Bharatiya Janata Party. Rawat is a member of the Uttarakhand Legislative Assembly from the Lansdowne constituency in Pauri Garhwal district.

References 

People from Pauri Garhwal district
Bharatiya Janata Party politicians from Uttarakhand
Members of the Uttarakhand Legislative Assembly
Living people
Uttarakhand MLAs 2017–2022
Year of birth missing (living people)
Uttarakhand MLAs 2022–2027